Hi and Lois is an American comic strip about a suburban family. Created by Mort Walker and illustrated by Dik Browne, both of whose offspring currently work on the strip, it debuted on October 18, 1954, distributed by King Features Syndicate.

Publication history
The Flagstons first appeared in Walker's Beetle Bailey.  They spun off into their own strip, written by Walker and drawn by Browne. Lois Flagston (née Bailey) is Beetle Bailey's sister and the two strips make occasional crossovers. One of these occurred on the strip's 40th anniversary in 1994, when Beetle visited his sister Lois and her family. Chip resembles his Uncle Beetle in attitude and appearance, especially the eyes.

The strip made efforts to keep up with the times, such as housewife Lois Flagston taking a career in real estate in 1980. In previous decades, the strip was acclaimed; in 1962, it earned Browne a Reuben Award from the National Cartoonists Society.

The strip faced some controversy given the changes in content restrictions since its debut in the 1950s.  Once, editors insisted that belly buttons could not appear; in protest, Browne included a box of dimpled navel oranges.

Now produced by the sons of the original creative team, the strip is written by Brian and Greg Walker and drawn by Robert "Chance" Browne and Eric Reaves.

As of 2016, Hi and Lois appears in 1,000 newspapers around the world.

Comic books
The Flagston family was also featured in a series of Charlton comic books.  Eleven issues were produced from November 1969 to July 1971. The cover price was fifteen cents.

TV animation
Hi and Lois were featured prominently in the animated television film Popeye Meets the Man Who Hated Laughter, which debuted on ABC on October 7, 1972, as part of the network's anthology series The ABC Saturday Superstar Movie.

Characters
Hi and Lois Flagston: Hi (short for Hiram) and Lois are typical middle-class American suburbanites. Their names are a pun on the "opposite" terms of "high and low". Hi is a sales manager, Lois is a realtor. They have four children.
Chip: a slovenly, indolent, teenaged high school boy; a running gag has Chip dating new girlfriends. Eight years old at the time the strip started, Chip grew into his teenage years by sometime in the 1960s, where he has stayed. 
Dot and Ditto: rambunctious  twins Dot (girl) and Ditto (boy), four-year-olds when the strip began, now (and since the late sixties) grade school-aged; Dot is the better student of the two.
Trixie: the Flagstons' freckled, blonde infant daughter, who loves "talking" (through thought balloons) to Sunbeam, a ray of sunlight.  While the other children have aged, Trixie has not.
Dawg: the Flagstons' large, lazy, shaggy sheepdog.
Thirsty Thurston: the Flagstons' fat, lazy, and frequently tipsy next-door neighbor; Hi's co-worker and golf buddy.
Irma Thurston: Thirsty's thin, weary, and long-suffering wife.
Abercrombie and Fitch: the friendly neighborhood garbage collectors. Their names are taken from the elite outfitter of sporting and excursion goods of that era, the name later acquired by a popular clothing manufacturer. Fitch's employee hat has the "s" in "trash" reversed, like the "Toys 'R' Us" logo.
Mr. Foofram: Owner and president of Foofram Industries, where Hi and Thirsty work. Diminutive and at times short-tempered, but not a tyrant.
Mr. Wavering: An elderly neighbor of Hi and Lois; he served as a corporal in the United States Marine Corps.

Reception
Ron Goulart praised Dik Browne's artwork for the strip, stating "Browne made Hi and Lois one of the most visually interesting strips on the comics page." In an article for Entertainment Weekly reviewing then-current comic strips, Ken Tucker gave Hi and Lois a B+ rating, and added that it had the "gentlest humor" of all the Mort Walker comic strips.

Collections and reprints
(All titles by Mort Walker and Dik Browne unless otherwise noted)
Trixie (1960) Avon
Hi and Lois (1970) Tempo Books
Hi and Lois in Darkest Suburbia (1971) Tempo
Hi and Lois: Beware! Children at Play (1972) Tempo
Hi and Lois: On the Grill (1973) Tempo
Hi and Lois: Family Album (1973) Tempo
Hi and Lois: Family Ties (1979) Tempo
Hi and Lois: Mama's Home (1982) Tempo
Hi and Lois: Suburban Cowboys (1982) Tempo
Hi and Lois: Father Figure (1982) Tempo
Hi and Lois: American Gothic (1983) Tempo
Hi and Lois: Dishwasher, Lawnmower or Snowplow? (1983) Tor
Hi and Lois: Home Sweat Home (1983) Tor
Hi and Lois: "Is Dinner Ready?" (1983) Tor
Hi and Lois: Saturday Night Fever (1983) Tor
Hi and Lois: "Hi Honey, I'm Home!" (1984) Tor
Hi and Lois: Mom, Where's My Homework? (1984) Tor
Hi and Lois: The Bright Stuff (1984) Charter
Hi and Lois: "How Do You Spell Dad?" (1985) Tor
Hi and Lois: Trixie à la Mode (1986) Tor
Hi and Lois: Good Housekeeping (1986) Tor
Hi and Lois: Dawg Day Afternoon! (1986) Tor
The Best of Hi and Lois (1986, 2005) Comicana
Hi and Lois: Sleep-Can (1987) Tor
Hi and Lois: Say "Cheese" (1987) Tor
Hi and Lois: Sleepbusters! (1987) Tor
Hi and Lois: House Calls (1988) Tor
Hi and Lois: Modern Chaos! (1989) Tor
Hi and Lois: Croquet for a Day (1989) Tor
Hi and Lois: Couch Potatoes! (1990) Tor
Hi and Lois: Wheels of Fortune (1990) Tor
Hi and Lois: Happy Campers (1990) Tor
Here Comes the Sun: A Hi and Lois Collection (1990) Avon
Hi and Lois: Mister Popularity (1991) Tor
Hi and Lois: Play Ball! (1991) Tor
Hi and Lois: Up Two Late (1991) Tor
Hi and Lois: Baby Talk (1991) Tor
Hi and Lois: Sunday Best by Brian and Greg Walker and Chance Browne (2005) ECW Press

References

External links

Official Facebook page
Official Hi and Lois Daily Comic page
King Features: Hi and Lois
Hi and Lois at Don Markstein's Toonopedia. Archived from the original on April 15, 2012.
Mort Walker Collection at University of Missouri (primary source material)

1954 comics debuts
American comics characters
American comic strips
Comics about married people
Comics about women
Comics characters introduced in 1954
Comics spin-offs
Fictional families
Fictional married couples
Gag-a-day comics
Slice of life comics